Sterlin Harjo (born November 14, 1979) is an American filmmaker. He has directed three feature films, a feature documentary, and the FX comedy series Reservation Dogs, all of them set in his home state of Oklahoma and concerned primarily with Native American people and content.

Early life and education
Harjo, a citizen of the Seminole Nation of Oklahoma who also has Muscogee heritage, was born and raised in Holdenville, Oklahoma. He attended the University of Oklahoma, where he studied art and film.

Career 
In 2004, he received a fellowship from the Sundance Institute. His short film “Goodnight, Irene” premiered at the 2005 Sundance Film Festival  and received a special jury award at the Aspen Shortsfest. In 2006, he received a fellowship from the newly formed organization United States Artists.

Harjo's first feature film, Four Sheets to the Wind, tells the story of a young Seminole man who travels from his small home town to Tulsa to visit his sister after the death of their father. The film premiered at the 2007 Sundance Film Festival, where it was nominated for the grand jury prize. Harjo was named best director at the 2007 American Indian Film Festival. The film's co-star Tamara Podemski won a Sundance special jury prize for her performance in the picture, and she was later nominated for best supporting actress at the 2007 Independent Spirit Awards.

Harjo's second feature, Barking Water, premiered at the 2009 Sundance festival. It portrays a road trip by a dying man and his former lover across Oklahoma to see his daughter and granddaughter in Wewoka, the capital of the Seminole Nation. Barking Water was named best drama film at the 2009 American Indian Film Festival.

Harjo's first feature documentary, This May Be the Last Time, is based on the story of Harjo's grandfather, who disappeared in 1962 in the Seminole County town of Sasakwa. It explores the subject of Creek Nation hymns and their connection to Scottish folk, gospel and rock music. The film premiered at the 2014 Sundance Film Festival and its distribution rights were subsequently acquired by AMC/Sundance Channel Global for the Sundance Channel. His third feature film, Mekko, a thriller set in Tulsa, premiered at the Los Angeles Film Festival in June 2015.

Harjo has also directed a number of short-form projects. His 2009 short film Cepanvkuce Tutcenen (Three Little Boys) was part of the Embargo Collective project commissioned by the imagineNATIVE Film + Media Arts Festival. He has directed a series of shorts for This Land Press in Tulsa, where Harjo is the staff video director. He was a member of the 2010 Sundance shorts competition jury.

Harjo is a founding member of a five-member Native American comedy group, the 1491s. He is also one of the directors of the Cherokee Nation's monthly television news magazine, Osiyo, Voices of the Cherokee People.

In 2021 FX released the first season of the groundbreaking Indigenous comedy series Reservation Dogs. The series is executive produced, directed, and co-written by Harjo, with Taika Waititi co-writing and executive producing. On September 2, 2021, FX renewed the series for a second season. More recently, he had signed a new overall deal at FX. In 2022, Reservation Dogs was recognized at the 37th Annual Film Independent Spirit Awards as Best New Scripted Series, and Best Ensemble Cast in a New Scripted Series. The awards were presented to series co-creator Waititi. At the Spirit Awards ceremony, actor Devery Jacobs said: “This prize is so much bigger than ourselves, just ourselves. Each of us come from different nations across Turtle Island who survived 500 years of colonization. And in the 100 years of film and TV, Reservation Dogs now marks the first project with all indigenous creatives at the helm.”

Awards
Harjo's was awarded the 2011 Tilghman Award from the Oklahoma Film Critics Circle and the Tulsa Library Trust's 2013 American Indian Writers Award. He was also awarded a 2021 Peabody Award for his producing the TV series Reservation Dogs.

References

External links
Official website

Sterlin Harjo at the National Museum of the American Indian

Muscogee people
Living people
Native American filmmakers
Artists from Tulsa, Oklahoma
People from Holdenville, Oklahoma
1979 births
University of Oklahoma alumni
Film directors from Oklahoma
Film producers from Oklahoma
Seminole Nation of Oklahoma people
20th-century Native Americans
21st-century Native Americans